Manouchehr Eghbal (13 October 1909 – 25 November 1977) was an Iranian physician and royalist politician. He was the Prime Minister of Iran from 1957 to 1960.

Early life and education
Eghbal was born in 1909, and his family were from Khorasan. He studied at Darolfonoon, and finished advanced studies in medicine in Paris in 1933.

Career

Following his graduation in 1933 Eghbal was employed as a physician in Mashhad. During the 1940s he was made deputy health minister. In 1950, Eghbal was appointed chancellor of Tabriz University, followed by Tehran University in 1954. Five years later he became Iran's envoy to UNESCO. He then taught at Sorbonne for a while and became a member of the French Académie Nationale de Médecine. During this period he founded the Nationalists' Party and served as the party's chair.

He served as the minister of health in Ahmad Ghavam's cabinet, minister of education in Abdolhosein Hazhir's cabinet (1948), minister of transportation in Ali Mansur's cabinet, and interior minister in Mohammad Sa'ed's cabinet. He also served as the governor of East Azarbaijan province.

In April 1957, he became prime minister, replacing Hussein Ala in the post. His cabinet lasted until September 1960, and he was replaced by Sharif Emami as prime minister. Until his death, he served as the chairman of the National Iranian Oil Company. He was also one of the close aides to the Shah and also, served as a board member of the royal organization of social welfare headed by Ashraf Pahlavi.

Personal life and death
Eghbal married a French woman and had three daughters. The eldest Nicole became a nun. The second, Monique, married a Swiss surgeon and had a daughter, Muriel Pedrazzini. The youngest daughter, Maryam Francoise, first married Prince Mahmoud Reza Pahlavi in October 1964 when she was 18 years old, but the marriage ended in divorce and she married Shahriar Shafiq.

Eghbal died of a heart attack on 25 November 1977 in Tehran, aged 68.

References

Further reading
'Alí Rizā Awsatí. (2003). Iran in the Past Three Centuries (Irān dar Se Qarn-e Goz̲ashteh ), Volumes 1 and 2 (Paktāb Publishing, Tehran, Iran).  (Vol. 1),  (Vol. 2).

External links

20th-century Iranian physicians
1909 births
1977 deaths
Chancellors of the University of Tehran
Democrat Party of Iran politicians
Governors of East Azerbaijan Province
Grand Crosses 1st class of the Order of Merit of the Federal Republic of Germany
Iranian expatriates in France
Iranian infectious disease physicians
Nationalists’ Party politicians
People from Kashmar
Prime Ministers of Iran
Presidents of the University of Tabriz
University of Tabriz alumni
Directors of the National Iranian Oil Company
Political party founders
Burials at Imam Reza Shrine